Acacia erioclada is a shrub belonging to the genus Acacia and the subgenus Phyllodineae native to Western Australia.

Description
The spinose branchlets are glabrescent with setaceous to narrowly triangular stipules. It blooms from June to July and produces yellow flowers. One simple inflorescence occurs per axil, the spherical flower heads contain 18 to 22 golden flowers. The phyllodes resemble those of Acacia sessilis

Taxonomy
The species was first formally described by the botanist George Bentham in 1855 as part of the work Plantae Muellerianae: Mimoseae as published in the journal Linnaea: ein Journal für die Botanik in ihrem ganzen Umfange, oder Beiträge zur Pflanzenkunde. It was reclassified as Racosperma eriocladum in 2003 by Leslie Pedley then transferred back to the genus Acacia in 2006. The type specimen was collected by James Drummond.

Distribution
It is endemic to an area in the Wheatbelt region of Western Australia where it is found on sandplains and rises growing in sandy rocky soils. The scattered distribution occurs between Watheroo and Bruce rock as part of heathland communities.

See also
 List of Acacia species

References

erioclada
Acacias of Western Australia
Plants described in 1855
Taxa named by George Bentham